The Massacre is a 1912 American silent Western film directed by D. W. Griffith and released by Biograph Studios. It stars Blanche Sweet and Wilfred Lucas. The film was shot in 1912 and released in Europe that year, but not released in the United States until 1914.

Cast
 Wilfred Lucas as Stephen
 Blanche Sweet as Stephen's ward
 Charles West as Stephen's ward's husband
 Alfred Paget as Indian Chief
 Lionel Barrymore
 Charles Craig
 Edward Dillon as John Randolph, In the Prologue/and in the Cavalry
 Charles Gorman as In Cavalry
 Robert Harron as In Cavalry
 Dell Henderson as In Wagon Train
 Harry Hyde as In Wagon Train
 J. Jiquel Lanoe as In Wagon Train
 Charles Hill Mailes as In Wagon Train
 Claire McDowell as Stephen's Belle, In Prologue
 W. Chrystie Miller as In Wagon Train
 Frank Opperman as Old Settler
 Jack Pickford as Young Boy
 W. C. Robinson as Amongst the Indians
 Kate Toncray as Maid, in Prologue

See also
 D. W. Griffith filmography
 Blanche Sweet filmography
 Lionel Barrymore filmography

References

External links

 
 The Massacre on YouTube
 The Massacre; allmovie.com/ synopsis

1912 films
1912 Western (genre) films
1912 short films
American black-and-white films
American silent short films
Articles containing video clips
Films directed by D. W. Griffith
Silent American Western (genre) films
Surviving American silent films
1910s American films
Silent war films
American war films
1910s English-language films